"Ship of Fools" (subtitled "Save Me from Tomorrow"
) is a rock song by World Party released as a second single from the 1987 debut album Private Revolution. It was written and produced by singer and multi-instrumentalist Karl Wallinger, formerly of The Waterboys. Wallinger was the sole member of World Party at the time of release.

Overview
It was World Party's sole Billboard Top 40 single, debuting on that chart on 4 April 1987 and peaking at number 27. It also reached no. 42 on the UK singles chart, no. 5 on the Billboard Mainstream Rock chart, and no. 4 on the Australian Music Report chart.

A longer version, at 6 minutes and 40 seconds, was released as a 12" single, with a double B Side of World Groove (Do The Mind Guerrilla) and Nowhere Man (Ensign ENYX 6606).

The song has also been included on over a dozen compilations, including Greenpeace's Rainbow Warriors compilation.

Track listings
All songs by Karl Wallinger except where noted

7-inch single 
 "Ship of Fools" – 4:13
 "World Groove (Do You Mind Guerrilla)" – 2:48

12-inch single 
 "Ship of Fools" – 6:37
 "World Groove (Do You Mind Guerrilla)" – 2:48
 "Nowhere Man" (John Lennon, Paul McCartney) – 2:45

Charts

Weekly charts

Year-end charts

Cover versions
Australian indie pop/rock band Something for Kate released an acoustic cover version of the song on their Live at the Corner album in 2008. A 2017 episode of the TV show Fargo (S3E5 "The House of Special Purpose)  features a minimalist cover of "Ship of Fools" performed for the series by show runner Noah Hawley and composer Jeff Russo. In 2021 alternative rock band Lazlo Bane released a music video for the song and later included it on their 2021 album Someday We'll Be Together.

References 

1987 debut singles
World Party songs
1986 songs
Songs written by Karl Wallinger